Mohit Abrol  (born 1 November 1988) is an Indian television actor. He is known for being a part of various TV shows like: Balika Vadhu, Razia Sultan, Pyaar Ko Ho Jaane Do, Tum Saath Ho Jab Apne, MTV Fanaah, Meri Aashiqui Tum Se Hi, Swaragini - Jodein Rishton Ke Sur, Gangaa, Kavach...Kaali Shaktiyon Se, Going home(short film) and Porus.

He has also done episodics in Yeh Hai Aashiqui, Pyaar Tune Kya Kiya and in Darr Sabko Lagta Hai. In 2017, he was seen in the web series Tanhaiyan as Siddharth. He went on to portray the role of Hasti in Sony TV's Porus''.

Personal life
He was engaged to television actress, Mansi Srivastava, but then they broke up after a while.

Filmography

Films

Television

References

External links

Living people
Male actors from Delhi
21st-century Indian male actors
Indian male television actors
Indian television presenters
Male actors in Hindi television
1988 births